Tetracis cervinaria is a moth of the family Geometridae first described by Alpheus Spring Packard in 1871. It is found in North America from British Columbia south to Kern County, California and eastward to western Montana, south-eastern Idaho, Carbon County, Wyoming and Larimer County, Colorado. It is found at elevations of 790 to 2,375 meters.

The length of the forewings 19–23 mm. Adults are on wing from February to June.

The larvae feed on Prunus emarginata and Prunus virginiana.

External links
Revision of the North American genera Tetracis Guenée and synonymization of Synaxis Hulst with descriptions of three new species (Lepidoptera: Geometridae: Ennominae)

Tetracis
Taxa named by Alpheus Spring Packard
Moths described in 1871